Hey Negrita may refer to:

Hey Negrita (band)
"Hey Negrita" (song), a song by The Rolling Stones that appeared on their 1976 album Black and Blue
Hey Negrita, horse in 2018 Road to the Kentucky Oaks